Lubań may refer to the following places:

 Lubań, Pomeranian Voivodeship, a village in northern Poland
 Lubań, Lower Silesian Voivodeship, a town in southwest Poland

See also
 Luban (disambiguation)
 Lyuban (disambiguation)